Joachim Kirschner (7 June 1920 – 17 December 1943) was a German Luftwaffe military aviator and fighter ace during World War II. He is credited with 188 aerial victories achieved in 635 combat missions. This figure includes 168 aerial victories on the Eastern Front, and further 20 victories over the Western Allies, including three heavy bombers.

Born in Niederlössnitz, Kirschner grew up in the Weimar Republic and Nazi Germany. He joined the military service in the Luftwaffe in 1939. Following flight training, he was posted to Jagdgeschwader 3 (JG 3—3rd Fighter Wing). Flying with this wing, Kirschner claimed his first aerial victory on 20 August 1941 fighting the Royal Air Force over the Netherlands. In early 1942, he fought in the Mediterranean theater during the Siege of Malta. In May, his unit was transferred to the Eastern Front where he was made Staffelkapitän (squadron leader) of 5. Staffel (5th squadron) of JG 26 in August 1942. Following his 51st aerial victory, he was nominated for the Knight's Cross of the Iron Cross which he received on 23 December 1942. On 27 April 1943, Kirschner claimed his 100th aerial victory. After claiming his 170th aerial victory, he was awarded the Knight's Cross of the Iron Cross with Oak Leaves on 2 August 1943. In October 1943, he was appointed Gruppenkommandeur (group commander) of IV. Gruppe of Jagdgeschwader 27 (JG 27—27th Fighter Wing) which was fighting over Greece and the Balkans. On 27 December 1943, Kirschner was shot down by fighters of the 57th Fighter Group and bailed out safely but was later killed by Yugoslav Partisans.

Early life and career
Kirschner was born on 7 June 1920 in Niederlössnitz, at the time in the Free State of Saxony of the Weimar Republic. He was the son of Andreas J. Kirschner, an insurance accountant. On 26 August 1939, he joined the military service with the Luftwaffe. From 1 October to 14 November, Kirschner served with 2./Flieger-Ausbildungs-Regiment 51 (2nd Company of 51st Flight Training Regiment) and then attended the Air War School Klotzsche until 30 June 1940. On 1 July, he was transferred to the Jagdfliegerschule 5 where he was trained as a fighter pilot. There, he was promoted to Leutnant on 1 February 1941.

World War II
World War II in Europe had begun on Friday 1 September 1939 when German forces invaded Poland. Kirschner joined the Ergänzungsgruppe of Jagdgeschwader 3 (JG 3—3rd Fighter Wing) on 9 May 1941. The Ergänzungsgruppe of JG 3, a supplementary training group, was formed in April 1941 in Krakau, present-day Kraków, under the command of Major Alfred Müller. The Gruppe was made up of two Staffeln (squadrons): The first squadron, designated 1. (Ergänzungsstaffel) or 1. Erg./JG 3, under the command of Haupmann Hans-Curt Graf von Sponeck, son of Hans Graf von Sponeck, was detached in January 1942 and a new created in February 1942 under command of Oberleuntnant Heinz Bohatsch. The second squadron, designated 2. (Ergänzungsstaffel) or 2. Erg./JG 3, was placed under the command of Oberleutnant Erwin Neuerburg. In July, the Ergänzungsgruppe was ordered to the Netherlands, providing fighter escort for German shipping on the English Channel. While the Stab (headquarters unit) and 2. Staffel were based at Amsterdam-Schiphol Airfield, 1. Staffel operated from an airfield at Bergen aan Zee near Alkmaar. On 20 August, ten Royal Air Force (RAF) Bristol Blenheim bombers, escorted by Supermarine Spitfire fighters, attacked 1. Staffels airfield at Bergen aan Zee. Defending against this attack, Kirschner claimed his first aerial victory when he shot down one of the escorting Spitfire fighters. In total, he flew 27 combat missions while assigned to the Ergänzungsgruppe.

On 22 December, he was transferred to 5. Staffel of JG 3. At the time, this squadron was headed by Oberleutnant Harald Moldenhauer and subordinated to II. Gruppe (2nd group) of JG 3 commanded by Hauptmann Karl-Heinz Krahl. At the time of Kirschner's posting to II. Gruppe, the unit was based at Wiesbaden-Erbenheim Airfield for a period of rest and replenishment after it had returned to Germany from the Eastern Front. In January 1942, II. Gruppe was ordered to move to Sicily. The Luftwaffe concentrated many units in Sicily, placed them under the command of II. Fliegerkorps (2nd Air Corps), in order to defeat the RAF in the Siege of Malta. Equipped with the Messerschmitt Bf 109 F-4 trop, the Gruppe and their equipment travelled by train to Bari in southern Italy. There the aircraft were reassembled and flown to Comiso Airfield, Sicily. The transfer was completed on 24 January and the Gruppe was then placed under the command of the Geschwaderstab of Jagdgeschwader 53 (JG 53—53rd Fighter Wing) which was already stationed there. On 26 March, II. Gruppe escorted Junkers Ju 87 to Malta. This aerial victory was claimed during the action which resulted in the sinking the British submarine . II. Gruppe flew its last combat mission over Malta on 25 April. The following day, the unit began its relocation to Pilsen where they arrived on 27 April.

Eastern Front
II. Gruppe had been ordered to the Eastern Front in preparation for Case Blue, the strategic summer offensive in southern Russia. While based at Pilsen, Hauptmann Kurt Brändle took over command of the Gruppe after Krahl had been killed in action over Malta. The Gruppe was then deployed on the left wing of Army Group South where it was based at Chuhuiv near the Donets on 19 May. On 21 May, II. There, Kirschner claimed a Ilyushin DB-3 bomber shot down, his first aerial victory on the Eastern Front.

Squadron leader

In late August 1942, II. Gruppe was withdrawn from the front and ordered to Neuhausen near Königsberg, present-day Guryevsk, for reequipment with the Bf 109 G-2. There, Moldenhauer, the commander of 5. Staffel was transferred. In consequence, Kirschner became the designated Staffelkapitän (squadron leader) of 5. Staffel. On 9 September, the Gruppe was ordered to Smolensk where it was subordinated to Jagdgeschwader 51 (JG 51—51st Fighter Wing).

He received the Honor Goblet of the Luftwaffe and the German Cross in Gold after claiming 51 aerial victories. On 27 April 1943, Kirschner was credited with his 100th aerial victory over a Douglas A-20 Havoc named "Boston". He was the 37th Luftwaffe pilot to achieve the century mark. In early May, II. Gruppe was moved to Kharkiv, from where they operated over the combat area east of Belgorod, operating in this area from 2 to 6 May. On 6 May, the Gruppe claimed twelve aerial victories, including four by Kirschner, taking his total to 113.

Kirschner claimed his 150th aerial victory on 5 Juli 1943, the first day of Operation Citadel, the German offensive phase of the Battle of Kursk. Preempting the German attack, Soviet aircraft attacked the German airfields in the early morning. Fighting in the aerial battles that day, Kirschner claimed nine aerial victories, his third "ace-in-a-day" achievement. That day, II. Gruppe intercepted Il-2 ground attack aircraft from 66 ShAP (Shturmovoy Aviatsionnyy Polk—Ground-attack Aviation Regiment) and 735 ShAP. Following his 170th aerial victory he received the Knight's Cross of the Iron Cross with Oak Leaves on 2 August 1943. The presentation was made by Adolf Hitler at the Wolf's Lair, Hitler's headquarters in Rastenburg, present-day Kętrzyn in Poland. Five other Luftwaffe officers were presented with awards that day by Hitler, Hauptmann Egmont Prinz zur Lippe-Weißenfeld, Hauptmann Heinrich Ehrler, Hauptmann Manfred Meurer, Hauptmann Werner Schröer, Oberleutnant Theodor Weissenberger were also awarded the Oak Leaves, and Major Helmut Lent received the Swords to his Knight's Cross with Oak Leaves.

Defense of the Reich
In early August 1943, II. Gruppe was withdrawn from the Eastern Front for service in Defense of the Reich on the Western Front. The Gruppe spent one-month training in northern Germany before they arrived at the Schiphol Airfield near Amsterdam in the Netherlands on 12 September. While based at Uetersen Airfield, the Gruppe received the Bf 109 G-6 which was equipped with Y-Control for fighters, a system used to control groups of fighters intercepting United States Army Air Forces (USAAF) bomber formations. On 24 September, II. Gruppe for the first engaged in combat with USAAF bombers. Guided by Y-Control, the Gruppe intercepted approximately 80 to 100 Boeing B-17 Flying Fortress bombers over sea. During this encounter, Kirschner shot down one of the B-17 bombers.

On 27 September, the USAAF VIII Bomber Command attacked the industrial areas and shipyards of Emden. Drop tank equipped Republic P-47 Thunderbolt for the first time escorted the bombers all the way to the target in Germany. The attack force was detected at 10:20 west of Terschelling heading east. At 10:33, II. Gruppe was scrambled. In the following encounter, Kirschner claimed a P-47 fighter shot down. On 2 October, VIII Bomber Command again headed for Emden. Defending against this attack, Kirschner claimed a B-17 bomber shot down. The following day, 140 Martin B-26 Marauder bombers, escorted by P-47 and Spitfire fighters, attacked the German airfields at Schiphol, Woensdrecht and Haamstede. II. Gruppe was unable to reach the bombers as they were engaged by the P-47 and Spitfire fighters. During this dogfight, Kirschner shot down one of the Spitfire fighters. On 4 October, VIII Bomber Command attacked Frankfurt am Main. German defenses failed to prevent the bombing. Luftwaffe pilots only claimed 14 aerial victories that day, including a B-17 bomber shot down by Kirschner. This was also Kirschner's last aerial victory in Defense of the Reich. He was transferred on 18 October, command of 5. Staffel was then passed on to Hauptmann Heinrich Sannemann.

Group commander and death
On 18 October, Kirschner was made Gruppenkommandeur (group commander) of IV. Gruppe of Jagdgeschwader 27 (JG 27—27th Fighter Wing) after the former commander Hauptmann Rudolf Sinner had been transferred on 13 September. In the intermediate period, two officers had led the Gruppe, Oberleutnant Dietrich Boesler, who was killed on 10 October, and by Oberleutnant Alfred Buk. At the time, IV. Gruppe was based at the Kalamaki Airfield in Athens, Greece and operated in the Mediterranean theatre. Kirschner claimed his first aerial victories in this theater of operations on 23 October. In two combat missions, he claimed the destruction of a Lockheed P-38 Lightning and two Spitfires. Two days later, he was credited with shooting down a P-38 fighter northwest of Cape of Rodon.

According to Bernstein, his victors were either Lieutenant Warren Shaw, who was credited with the destruction of one Bf 109 or by the Lieutenants Charles Leaf and Hugh Barlow, who were credited with a shared victory from the USAAF 57th Fighter Group. Kirschner bailed out safely and landed by parachute between the villages of Bjelojevići and Donje Hrasno. He was killed by a firing squad from the Yugoslav Partisan 29th Hercegovina Division at Metković. The Germans sent out search parties from Mostar airfield immediately after his downing, with one being ambushed by the Partisans on 19 December. As late as mid-February 1944, a battalion of the 7th SS Volunteer Mountain Division Prinz Eugen was fruitlessly searching for Kirschner. According to a report filed by SS-Sturmbannführer Walter Moreth of the SS-Gebirgs-Flak-Abteilung 7 (7th SS Mountain Anti-Aircraft Battalion), Kirscher was found with his throat slit and gouged out eyes.

Summary of career

Aerial victory claims
According to US historian David T. Zabecki, Kirschner was credited with 188 aerial victories. Spick also lists Kirschner with 188 aerial victories claimed in approximately 600 combat missions. This figure includes 167 aerial victories on the Eastern Front, and further 21 victories over the Western Allies, including two heavy bombers. Obermaier also states that he was credited with 188 aerial victories with 168 on the Eastern Front and 20 over the Western Allies. According to Stockert, Kirschner also claimed 188 aerial victories plus further 22 ground victories achieved in 635 combat missions. Mathews and Foreman, authors of Luftwaffe Aces — Biographies and Victory Claims, researched the German Federal Archives and found records for 181 aerial victory claims, plus five further unconfirmed claims. This figure includes 162 aerial victories on the Eastern Front and 19 over the Western Allies.

Victory claims were logged to a map-reference (PQ = Planquadrat), for example "PQ 39362". These sectors were then subdivided into 36 smaller units to give a location area 3 × 4 km in size.

Awards
 Iron Cross (1939)
 2nd Class (27 January 1942)
 1st Class (12 April 1942)
 Front Flying Clasp of the Luftwaffe for Fighter Pilots in Gold (2 June 1942)
 Honor Goblet of the Luftwaffe on 21 December 1942 as Leutnant and pilot
 German Cross in Gold on 3 December 1942 as Leutnant in the 5./Jagdgeschwader 3
 Knight's Cross of the Iron Cross with Oak Leaves
 Knight's Cross on 23 December 1942 as Leutnant and Staffelführer of the 5./Jagdgeschwader 3 "Udet"
 267th Oak Leaves on 2 August 1943 as Oberleutnant and Staffelkapitän of the 5./Jagdgeschwader 3 "Udet"

Notes

References

Citations

Bibliography

 
 
 
 
 
 
 
 
 
 
 
 
 
 
 
 
 
 
 
 
 
 
 
 
 

1920 births
1943 deaths
People from Erzgebirgskreis
Luftwaffe pilots
German World War II flying aces
Luftwaffe personnel killed in World War II
Recipients of the Gold German Cross
Recipients of the Knight's Cross of the Iron Cross with Oak Leaves
Military personnel from Saxony